The confused moth (Helicoverpa confusa) is an extinct species of moth in the family Noctuidae.

It was endemic to Hawaii.

References

Sources
IUCN Red List of all current threatened species

Taxonomy articles created by Polbot
Endemic moths of Hawaii
Extinct Hawaiian animals
Extinct moths
Extinct insects since 1500